Harmse is a surname that originates from Northern Germany and the Northeastern Netherlands.

The surname Harmse is a variation of the surnames Harms and Harmsen. See town Harmstorf, Schleswig-Holstein, Germany. 

The surname also occurs in South-Africa due to settlement in the region.

Notable people with the surname include:

Chris Harmse (born 1973), South-African hammer thrower
Kevin Harmse (born 1984), South-African born Canadian soccer player